John Paul Ruttan (born May 12, 2001) is a Canadian actor who is best known for RoboCop and This Means War.

In 2012 he was nominated for the Best Performance in a Voice-Over Role at the 33rd Young Artist Awards for his work in the Doodlebops Rockin' Road Show. In 2015 he became an award winning actor with Best Performance in a Feature Film for his supporting role as RoboCop's son David Murphy in the 2014 remake of RoboCop. In 2015 he won Best Lead Performance for Shelby: The Dog Who Saved Christmas.

Life and career 
Ruttan was born in Toronto, Ontario. He had an early love for films and started acting at age 6, when he met with his current agent. By age 8 he had already starred in numerous television shows. In 2008 he appeared as a guest star on the Rick Mercer Report portraying a young Jack Layton, a Canadian NDP leader, on the episode "Election Kids". The following year Ruttan guest starred in the series Mighty Mama for CBC and guest starred in the Doodlebops Rockin' Road Show. Other television performances include Murdoch Mysteries, The Listener, and Degrassi: The Next Generation.

His introduction into movies were the television films The Two Mr. Kissels and Will you Merry Me?. In 2010 he performed in his first short-film, Ninety-one, written and directed by Jill Carter. Ruttan's feature film debut was in Defendor with Woody Harrelson in 2010, playing Young Jack Carter.

In 2012, Ruttan appeared in the role of Tom Hardy's character's son, Joe, in the feature film This Means War alongside Reese Witherspoon and Chris Pine.  Ruttan's performance in the film earned him a Young Artist Award nomination as Best Supporting Young Actor Age Ten and Under in a Feature Film. He has also has played Young William Murdoch on Murdoch Mysteries in 2014 and 2015.

Ruttan has a blue belt in karate and does his own stunt work.

Filmography

References

External links 
 

2001 births
Canadian male child actors
Canadian male film actors
Canadian male television actors
Living people
Male actors from Toronto